The 1927 Preakness Stakes was the 52nd running of the $63,100 Preakness Stakes Thoroughbred horse race. The race took place on May 9, 1927, and was won by Bostonian who was ridden by Whitey Abel. The colt won the race by a half length over runner-up Sir Harry. The mile and three sixteenths race was run on a track rated good in a final time of 2:01 3/5.

Payout 
The 52nd Preakness Stakes Payout Schedule

 * Coupled

The full chart 
Daily Racing Form Chart

 Winning Breeder: Wheatley Stable; (KY)
 Times: 1/4 mile – 0:23 2/5;  3/4 mile – 1:14 flat; mile – 1:41 2/5; 1 3/16 (final) – 2:01 3/5
 Track Condition: Good

References

External links 
 

1927
Pimlico Race Course
1927 in horse racing
1927 in American sports
1927 in sports in Maryland
Horse races in Maryland